Sylvania (minor planet designation: 519 Sylvania) is a minor planet orbiting the Sun.

References

External links
 
 

Background asteroids
Sylvania
Sylvania
S-type asteroids (Tholen)
S-type asteroids (SMASS)
19031020